The 1915 Tennessee Volunteers football team represented the University of Tennessee in the 1915 college football season.  Zora G. Clevenger served his fifth and final season as head coach before leaving for Kansas State.  The 1915 Vols went 4–4.  Tennessee's loss to Clemson on October 9 ended a 12-game winning streak that spanned back to the final game of the 1913 season.

Schedule

References

Tennessee
Tennessee Volunteers football seasons
Tennessee Volunteers football